Islamophobia is the fear of, hatred of, or prejudice against the religion of Islam or Muslims in general, especially when seen as a geopolitical force or a source of terrorism.

The scope and precise definition of the term Islamophobia, is the subject of debate. Some scholars consider it to be a form of xenophobia or racism, some consider Islamophobia and racism to be closely related or partially overlapping phenomena, while others dispute any relationship; primarily on the grounds that religion is not a race.

The causes of Islamophobia are also the subject of debate, most notably between commentators who have posited an increase in Islamophobia resulting from the September 11 attacks, the rise of the militant group Islamic State, other terror attacks in Europe and the United States by Islamic extremists, those who associated it with the increased presence of Muslims in the United States and in the European Union, and  others who view it as a response to the emergence of a global Muslim identity.

On 15 March 2022, the United Nations General Assembly adopted a resolution by consensus which was introduced by Pakistan on behalf of the Organisation of Islamic Cooperation that proclaimed March 15 as 'International Day to Combat Islamophobia'.

Terms
There are a number of other possible terms which are also used in order to refer to negative feelings and attitudes towards Islam and Muslims, such as anti-Muslimism, intolerance against Muslims, anti-Muslim prejudice, anti-Muslim bigotry, hatred of Muslims, anti-Islamism, Muslimophobia, demonisation of Islam, or demonisation of Muslims. In German, Islamophobie (fear) and Islamfeindlichkeit (hostility) are used. The Scandinavian term Muslimhat literally means "hatred of Muslims".

When discrimination towards Muslims has placed an emphasis on their religious affiliation and adherence, it has been termed Muslimphobia, the alternative form of Muslimophobia, Islamophobism, antimuslimness and antimuslimism. Individuals who discriminate against Muslims in general have been termed Islamophobes, Islamophobists, anti-Muslimists, antimuslimists, islamophobiacs, anti-Muhammadan, Muslimphobes or its alternative spelling of Muslimophobes, while individuals motivated by a specific anti-Muslim agenda or bigotry have been described as being anti-mosque, anti-Shiites (or Shiaphobes), anti-Sufism (or Sufi-phobia) and anti-Sunni (or Sunniphobes).

Etymology and definitions 
The word Islamophobia is a neologism formed from Islam and -phobia, a Greek suffix used in English to form "nouns with the sense 'fear , 'aversion 

According to the Oxford English Dictionary, the word means "Intense dislike or fear of Islam, esp. as a political force; hostility or prejudice towards Muslims". It is attested in English as early as 1923 to quote the French word islamophobie, found in a thesis published by Alain Quellien in 1910 to describe a "a prejudice against Islam that is widespread among the peoples of Western and Christian civilization". The expression did not immediately turn into the vocabulary of the English-speaking world though, which preferred the expression "feelings inimical to Islam", until its re-appearance in an article by Georges Chahati Anawati in 1976. The term did not exist in the Muslim world, and was later translated in the 1990s as ruhāb al-islām (رُهاب الإسلام) in Arabic, literally "phobia of Islam".

The University of California at Berkeley's Islamophobia Research & Documentation Project suggested this working definition: "Islamophobia is a contrived fear or prejudice fomented by the existing Eurocentric and Orientalist global power structure.  It is directed at a perceived or real Muslim threat through the maintenance and extension of existing disparities in economic, political, social and cultural relations, while rationalizing the necessity to deploy violence as a tool to achieve 'civilizational rehab' of the target communities (Muslim or otherwise).  Islamophobia reintroduces and reaffirms a global racial structure through which resource distribution disparities are maintained and extended."

Debate on the term and its limitations
In 1996, the Runnymede Trust established the Commission on British Muslims and Islamophobia (CBMI), chaired by Gordon Conway, the vice-chancellor of the University of Sussex. The Commission's report, Islamophobia: A Challenge for Us All, was published in November 1997 by the Home Secretary, Jack Straw. In the Runnymede report, Islamophobia was defined as "an outlook or world-view involving an unfounded dread and dislike of Muslims, which results in practices of exclusion and discrimination." The introduction of the term was justified by the report's assessment that "anti-Muslim prejudice has grown so considerably and so rapidly in recent years that a new item in the vocabulary is needed".

In 2008, a workshop on 'Thinking Thru Islamophobia' was held at the University of Leeds, organized by the Centre for Ethnicity and Racism Studies, the participants included S. Sayyid, Abdoolkarim Vakil, Liz Fekete, and Gabrielle Maranci among others. The symposium proposed a definition of Islamophobia which rejected the idea of Islamophobia as being the product of closed and open views of Islam and focused on Islamophobia as performative which problematized Muslim agency and identity. The symposium was an early attempt to bring insights from critical race theory, postcolonial and decolonial thought to bear on the question of Islamophobia.

At a 2009 symposium on "Islamophobia and Religious Discrimination", Robin Richardson, a former director of the Runnymede Trust and the editor of Islamophobia: a challenge for us all, said that "the disadvantages of the term Islamophobia are significant" on seven different grounds, including that it implies it is merely a "severe mental illness" affecting "only a tiny minority of people"; that use of the term makes those to whom it is applied "defensive and defiant" and absolves the user of "the responsibility of trying to understand them" or trying to change their views; that it implies that hostility to Muslims is divorced from factors such as skin color, immigrant status, fear of fundamentalism, or political or economic conflicts; that it conflates prejudice against Muslims in one's own country with dislike of Muslims in countries with which the West is in conflict; that it fails to distinguish between people who are against all religion from people who dislike Islam specifically; and that the actual issue being described is hostility to Muslims, "an ethno-religious identity within European countries", rather than hostility to Islam. Nonetheless, he argued that the term is here to stay, and that it is important to define it precisely.

The exact definition of Islamophobia continues to be discussed with academics such as Chris Allen saying that it lacks a clear definition. According to Erik Bleich, in his article "Defining and Researching Islamophobia", even when definitions are more specific, there is still significant variation in the precise formulations of Islamophobia. As with parallel concepts like homophobia or xenophobia, Islamophobia connotes a broader set of negative attitudes or emotions directed at individuals of groups because of perceived membership in a defined category.  Mattias Gardell defines Islamophobia as "socially reproduced prejudices and aversion to Islam and Muslims, as well as actions and practices that attack, exclude or discriminate against persons on the basis that they are or perceived to be Muslim and be associated with Islam".

Fear
As opposed to being a psychological or individualistic phobia, according to professors of religion Peter Gottschalk and Gabriel Greenberg, "Islamophobia" connotes a social anxiety about Islam and Muslims. Some social scientists have adopted this definition and developed instruments to measure Islamophobia in form of fearful attitudes towards, and avoidance of, Muslims and Islam, arguing that Islamophobia should "essentially be understood as an affective part of social stigma towards Islam and Muslims, namely fear".

Racism

Several scholars consider Islamophobia to be a form of xenophobia or racism. A 2007 article in Journal of Sociology defines Islamophobia as anti-Muslim racism and a continuation of anti-Asian, anti-Turkic and anti-Arab racism. In their books Deepa Kumar and Junaid Rana have argued that formation of Islamophobic discourses has paralleled the development of other forms of racial bigotry.
Similarly, John Denham has drawn parallels between modern Islamophobia and the antisemitism of the 1930s, so have Maud Olofsson, and Jan Hjärpe, among others.

Others have questioned the relationship between Islamophobia and racism. Jocelyne Cesari writes that "academics are still debating the legitimacy of the term and questioning how it differs from other terms such as racism, anti-Islamism, anti-Muslimness, and anti-Semitism." Erdenir finds that "there is no consensus on the scope and content of the term and its relationship with concepts such as racism ..." and Shryock, reviewing the use of the term across national boundaries, comes to the same conclusion.

Some scholars view Islamophobia and racism as partially overlapping phenomena. Diane Frost defines Islamophobia as anti-Muslim feeling and violence based on "race" or religion. Islamophobia may also target people who have Muslim names, or have a look that is associated with Muslims. According to Alan Johnson, Islamophobia sometimes can be nothing more than xenophobia or racism "wrapped in religious terms". Sociologists Yasmin Hussain and Paul Bagguley stated that racism and Islamophobia are "analytically distinct", but "empirically inter-related".

The European Commission against Racism and Intolerance (ECRI) defines Islamophobia as "the fear of or prejudiced viewpoint towards Islam, Muslims and matters pertaining to them", adding that whether "it takes the shape of daily forms of racism and discrimination or more violent forms, Islamophobia is a violation of human rights and a threat to social cohesion".

Proposed alternatives
The concept of Islamophobia as formulated by Runnymede was also criticized by professor Fred Halliday. He writes that the target of hostility in the modern era is not Islam and its tenets as much as it is Muslims, suggesting that a more accurate term would be "Anti-Muslimism". He also states that strains and types of prejudice against Islam and Muslims vary across different nations and cultures, which is not recognized in the Runnymede analysis, which was specifically about Muslims in Britain. Poole responds that many Islamophobic discourses attack what they perceive to be Islam's tenets, while Miles and Brown write that Islamophobia is usually based upon negative stereotypes about Islam which are then translated into attacks on Muslims. They also argue that "the existence of different 'Islamophobias' does not invalidate the concept of Islamophobia any more than the existence of different racisms invalidates the concept of racism."

In a 2011 paper in American Behavioral Scientist, Erik Bleich stated "there is no widely accepted definition of Islamophobia that permits systematic comparative and causal analysis", and advances "indiscriminate negative attitudes or emotions directed at Islam or Muslims" as a possible solution to this issue.

In order to differentiate between prejudiced views of Islam and secularly motivated criticism of Islam, Roland Imhoff and Julia Recker formulated the concept "Islamoprejudice", which they subsequently operationalised in an experiment. The experiment showed that their definition provided a tool for accurate differentiation. Nevertheless, other researchers' experimental work indicates that, even when Westerners seem to make an effort to distinguish between criticizing (Muslim) ideas and values and respecting Muslims as persons, they still show prejudice and discrimination of Muslims—compared to non-Muslims—when these targets defend supposedly antiliberal causes.

Origins and causes

History of the term

One early use cited as the term's first use is by the painter Alphonse Étienne Dinet and Algerian intellectual Sliman ben Ibrahim in their 1918 biography of Islam's prophet Muhammad. Writing in French, they used the term . Robin Richardson writes that in the English version of the book the word was not translated as "Islamophobia" but rather as "feelings inimical to Islam". Dahou Ezzerhouni has cited several other uses in French as early as 1910, and from 1912 to 1918. These early uses of the term did not, according to Christopher Allen, have the same meaning as in contemporary usage, as they described a fear of Islam by liberal Muslims and Muslim feminists, rather than a fear or dislike/hatred of Muslims by non-Muslims. On the other hand, Fernando Bravo López argues that Dinet and ibn Sliman's use of the term was as a criticism of overly hostile attitudes to Islam by a Belgian orientalist, Henri Lammens, whose project they saw as a "'pseudo-scientific crusade in the hope of bringing Islam down once and for all. He also notes that an early definition of Islamophobia appears in the 1910 Ph.D. thesis of Alain Quellien, a French colonial bureaucrat:
For some, the Muslim is the natural and irreconcilable enemy of the Christian and the European; Islam is the negation of civilization, and barbarism, bad faith and cruelty are the best one can expect from the Mohammedans.
Furthermore, he notes that Quellien's work draws heavily on the work of the French colonial department's 1902–06 administrator, who published a work in 1906, which to a great extent mirrors John Esposito's The Islamic Threat: Myth or Reality?.

The first recorded use of the term in English, according to the Oxford English Dictionary, was in 1923 in an article in The Journal of Theological Studies. The term entered into common usage with the publication of the Runnymede Trust's report in 1997. "Kofi Annan asserted at a 2004 conference entitled "Confronting Islamophobia" that the word Islamophobia had to be coined in order to "take account of increasingly widespread bigotry".

Contrasting views on Islam
The Runnymede report contrasted "open" and "closed" views of Islam, and stated that the following "closed" views are equated with Islamophobia:

Islam is seen as a monolithic bloc, static and unresponsive to change.
It is seen as separate and "other". It does not have values in common with other cultures, is not affected by them and does not influence them.
It is seen as inferior to the West. It is seen as barbaric, irrational, primitive, and sexist.
It is seen as violent, aggressive, threatening, supportive of terrorism, and engaged in a clash of civilizations.
It is seen as a political ideology, used for political or military advantage.
Criticisms made of "the West" by Muslims are rejected out of hand.
Hostility towards Islam is used to justify discriminatory practices towards Muslims and exclusion of Muslims from mainstream society.
Anti-Muslim hostility is seen as natural and normal.

These "closed" views are contrasted, in the report, with "open" views on Islam which, while founded on respect for Islam, permit legitimate disagreement, dialogue and critique. According to Benn and Jawad, The Runnymede Trust notes that anti-Muslim discourse is increasingly seen as respectable, providing examples on how hostility towards Islam and Muslims is accepted as normal, even among those who may actively challenge other prevalent forms of discrimination.

Identity politics
It has been suggested that Islamophobia is closely related to identity politics, and gives its adherents the perceived benefit of constructing their identity in opposition to a negative, essentialized image of Muslims. This occurs in the form of self-righteousness, assignment of blame and key identity markers. Davina Bhandar writes that:

She views this as an ontological trap that hinders the perception of culture as something "materially situated in the living practices of the everyday, situated in time-space and not based in abstract projections of what constitutes either a particular tradition or culture."

In some societies, Islamophobia has materialized due to the portrayal of Islam and Muslims as the national "Other", where exclusion and discrimination occurs on the basis of their religion and civilization which differs with national tradition and identity. Examples include Pakistani and Algerian migrants in Britain and France respectively. This sentiment, according to Malcolm Brown and Robert Miles, significantly interacts with racism, although Islamophobia itself is not racism. Author Doug Saunders has drawn parallels between Islamophobia in the United States and its older discrimination and hate against Roman Catholics, saying that Catholicism was seen as backwards and imperial, while Catholic immigrants had poorer education and some were responsible for crime and terrorism.

Brown and Miles write that another feature of Islamophobic discourse is to amalgamate nationality (e.g. Saudi), religion (Islam), and politics (terrorism, fundamentalism) – while most other religions are not associated with terrorism, or even "ethnic or national distinctiveness". They feel that "many of the stereotypes and misinformation that contribute to the articulation of Islamophobia are rooted in a particular perception of Islam", such as the notion that Islam promotes terrorism – especially prevalent after the September 11, 2001 attacks.

The two-way stereotyping resulting from Islamophobia has in some instances resulted in mainstreaming of earlier controversial discourses, such as liberal attitudes towards gender equality and homosexuals. Christina Ho has warned against framing of such mainstreaming of gender equality in a colonial, paternal discourse, arguing that this may undermine minority women's ability to speak out about their concerns.

Steven Salaita contends that, since 9/11, Arab Americans have evolved from what Nadine Naber described as an invisible group in the United States into a highly visible community that directly or indirectly has an effect on the United States' culture wars, foreign policy, presidential elections and legislative tradition.

The academics S. Sayyid and Abdoolkarim Vakil maintain that Islamophobia is a response to the emergence of a distinct Muslim public identity globally, the presence of Muslims in itself not being an indicator of the degree of Islamophobia in a society. Sayyid and Vakil maintain that there are societies where virtually no Muslims live but many institutionalized forms of Islamophobia still exist in them.

Links to ideologies
 

Cora Alexa Døving, a senior scientist at the Norwegian Center for Studies of the Holocaust and Religious Minorities, argues that there are significant similarities between Islamophobic discourse and European pre-Nazi antisemitism. Among the concerns are imagined threats of minority growth and domination, threats to traditional institutions and customs, skepticism of integration, threats to secularism, fears of sexual crimes, fears of misogyny, fears based on historical cultural inferiority, hostility to modern Western Enlightenment values, etc.

 has argued that there are important differences between Islamophobia and antisemitism. While antisemitism was a phenomenon closely connected to European nation-building processes, he sees Islamophobia as having the concern of European civilization as its focal point. Døving, on the other hand, maintains that, at least in Norway, the Islamophobic discourse has a clear national element. In a reply to Bunzl, French scholar of Jewish history, Esther Benbassa, agrees with him in that he draws a clear connection between modern hostile and essentializing sentiments towards Muslims and historical antisemitism. However, she argues against the use of the term Islamophobia, since, in her opinion, it attracts unwarranted attention to an underlying racist current.

The head of the Media Responsibility Institute in Erlangen, Sabine Schiffer, and researcher Constantin Wagner, who also define Islamophobia as anti-Muslim racism, outline additional similarities and differences between Islamophobia and antisemitism. They point out the existence of equivalent notions such as "Judaisation/Islamisation", and metaphors such as "a state within a state" are used in relation to both Jews and Muslims. In addition, both discourses make use of, among other rhetorical instruments, "religious imperatives" supposedly "proven" by religious sources, and conspiracy theories.

The differences between Islamophobia and antisemitism consist of the nature of the perceived threats to the "Christian West". Muslims are perceived as "inferior" and as a visible "external threat", while on the other hand, Jews are perceived as "omnipotent" and as an invisible "internal threat". However, Schiffer and Wagner also note that there is a growing tendency to view Muslims as a privileged group that constitute an "internal threat" and that this convergence between the two discources makes "it more and more necessary to use findings from the study of anti-Semitism to analyse Islamophobia". Schiffer and Wagner conclude,

The publication Social Work and Minorities: European Perspectives describes Islamophobia as the new form of racism in Europe, arguing that "Islamophobia is as much a form of racism as anti-semitism, a term more commonly encountered in Europe as a sibling of racism, xenophobia and intolerance." Edward Said considers Islamophobia as it is evinced in Orientalism to be a trend in a more general antisemitic Western tradition. Others note that there has been a transition from anti-Asian and anti-Arab racism to anti-Muslim racism, while some note a racialization of religion.

According to a 2012 report by a UK anti-racism group, counter-jihadist outfits in Europe and North America are becoming more cohesive by forging alliances, with 190 groups now identified as promoting an Islamophobic agenda. In Islamophobia and its consequences on young people (p. 6) Ingrid Ramberg writes "Whether it takes the shape of daily forms of racism and discrimination or more violent forms, Islamophobia is a violation of human rights and a threat to social cohesion." Professor John Esposito of Georgetown University calls Islamophobia "the new anti-Semitism".

In their 2018 American Muslim Poll, the Institute for Social Policy and Understanding found that when it came to their Islamophobia index (see Public Opinion), they found that those who scored higher on the index, (i.e. more islamophobic) were, "associated with 1) greater acceptance of targeting civilians, whether it is a military or individual/small group that is doling out the violence, 2) greater acquiescence to limiting both press freedoms and institutional checks following a hypothetical terror attack, and 3) greater support for the so-called "Muslim ban" and the surveillance of American mosques (or their outright building prohibition)."

Mohamed Nimer compares Islamophobia with anti-Americanism. He argues that while both Islam and America can be subject to legitimate criticisms without detesting a people as a whole, bigotry against both are on the rise.

Gideon Rachman wrote in 2019 of a "clash of civilizations" between Muslim and non-Muslim nations, linking anti-Islam radicalisation outside the Muslim world to the rise of intolerant Islamism in some Muslim countries that used to be relatively free from that ideology.

Opposition to multiculturalism
According to Gabrielle Maranci, the increasing Islamophobia in the West is related to a rising repudiation of multiculturalism. Maranci concludes that "Islamophobia is a 'phobia' of multiculturalism and the transruptive effect that Islam can have in Europe and the West through transcultural processes." Other main cause of Islamophobia in the west is mainly due to the sheer lack of knowledge that the west has about 'Islam' as a religion. The west is unaware about the teachings or the purpose of Islam. Muslims following religious beliefs of Islam, like wearing their traditional clothes or speaking their native language are labelled as 'Inferiors' or 'Terrorists'.

Manifestations

Media

According to Elizabeth Poole in the Encyclopedia of Race and Ethnic Studies, the media have been criticized for perpetrating Islamophobia. She cites a case study examining a sample of articles in the British press from between 1994 and 2004, which concluded that Muslim viewpoints were underrepresented and that issues involving Muslims usually depicted them in a negative light. Such portrayals, according to Poole, include the depiction of Islam and Muslims as a threat to Western security and values. Benn and Jawad write that hostility towards Islam and Muslims are "closely linked to media portrayals of Islam as barbaric, irrational, primitive and sexist." Egorova and Tudor cite European researchers in suggesting that expressions used in the media such as "Islamic terrorism", "Islamic bombs" and "violent Islam" have resulted in a negative perception of Islam. John E. Richardson's 2004 book (Mis)representing Islam: the racism and rhetoric of British broadsheet newspapers, criticized the British media for propagating negative stereotypes of Muslims and fueling anti-Muslim prejudice. In another study conducted by John E. Richardson, he found that 85% of mainstream newspaper articles treated Muslims as a homogeneous mass and portrayed them as a threat to British society.

The Universities of Georgia and Alabama in the United States conducted a study comparing media coverage of "terrorist attacks" committed by Islamist militants with those of non-Muslims in the United States.  Researchers found that "terrorist attacks" by Islamist militants receive 357% more media attention than attacks committed by non-Muslims or whites. Terrorist attacks committed by non-Muslims (or where the religion was unknown) received an average of 15 headlines, while those committed by Muslim extremists received 105 headlines. The study was based on an analysis of news reports covering terrorist attacks in the United States between 2005 and 2015.

In 2009, Mehdi Hasan in the New Statesman criticized Western media for over-reporting a few Islamist terrorist incidents but under-reporting the much larger number of planned non-Islamist terrorist attacks carried out by "non-Irish white folks".  A 2012 study indicates that Muslims across different European countries, such as France, Germany and the United Kingdom, experience the highest degree of Islamophobia in the media. Media personalities have been accused of Islamophobia. The obituary in The Guardian for the Italian journalist Oriana Fallaci described her as "notorious for her Islamaphobia" . The Institute for Social Policy and Understanding published a report in 2018 where they stated, "In terms of print media coverage, Muslim-perceived perpetrators received twice the absolute quantity of media coverage as their non-Muslim counterparts in the cases of violent completed acts. For "foiled" plots, they received seven and half times the media coverage as their counterparts."

The term "Islamophobia industry" has been coined by Nathan Lean and John Esposito in the 2012 book The Islamophobia Industry: How the Right Manufactures Fear of Muslims. Unlike the relationship of a buyer and a seller, it is a relationship of mutual benefit, where ideologies and political proclivities converge to advance the same agenda. The "Islamophobia industry" has since been discussed by other scholars including Joseph Kaminski, Hatem Bazian, Arlene Stein, Zakia Salime, Reza Aslan, Erdoan A. Shipoli, and Deepa Kumar, the latter drawing a comparison between the "Islamophobia industry" and Cold War era McCarthyism.

Some media outlets are working explicitly against Islamophobia. In 2008 Fairness and Accuracy in Reporting ("FAIR") published a study "Smearcasting, How Islamophobes Spread Bigotry, Fear and Misinformation". The report cites several instances where mainstream or close to mainstream journalists, authors and academics have made analyses that essentialize negative traits as an inherent part of Muslims' moral makeup. FAIR also established the "Forum Against Islamophobia and Racism", designed to monitor coverage in the media and establish dialogue with media organizations. Following the attacks of 11 September 2001, the Islamic Society of Britain's "Islam Awareness Week" and the "Best of British Islam Festival" were introduced to improve community relations and raise awareness about Islam. In 2012, the Organisation of Islamic Cooperation stated that they will launch a TV channel to counter Islamophobia.

Silva and Meaux et al both theorized that one of the main causes of negative interactions, stigma, and marginalization toward the Arabic community is due to the fact that many media framing from news outlets tend to associate Arab-Muslims with terrorism and jihadist-inspired motivations when it came to mass violence incidents. Silva noted in their research looking through New York Times articles about gun violence and noted that over the sixteen-year period of 2000 until 2016 this media framing would only increase through the time period. Silva compared his results to find out that Arabic perpetrators were significantly more like to be framed as terrorists than their White counterparts. Meaux et al note back to research conducted by Park et al that indicated that the most salient association that Americans held on to was Arab-Muslims to terrorism with the notion that people that believed in this association the strongest were more likely to hold implicit bias.

Movies 
Throughout the twentieth century, Muslim characters were portrayed in Hollywood often negatively and with Orientalist stereotypes visualising them as being "uncivilised". Since the Post-9/11 era, in addition to these tropes, a securitization of Muslims; portraying them as a threat to the Western world, have drastically increased in movie depictions.

There are growing instances of Islamophobia in Hindi cinema, or Bollywood, in films such as Aamir (2008), New York (2009) and My Name is Khan (2010), which corresponds to a growing anti-minorities sentiment that followed the resurgence of the Hindu right.

Organizations

A report from the University of California Berkeley and the Council on American–Islamic Relations estimated that  was funded to 33 groups whose primary purpose was "to promote prejudice against, or hatred of, Islam and Muslims" in the United States between 2008 and 2013, with a total of 74 groups contributing to Islamophobia in the United States during that period.

Stop Islamization of America (SIOA) and the Freedom Defense Initiative are designated as hate groups by the Anti-Defamation League and the Southern Poverty Law Center. In August 2012 SIOA generated media publicity by sponsoring billboards in New York City Subway stations claiming there had been 19,250 terrorist attacks by Muslims since 9/11 and stating "it's not Islamophobia, it's Islamorealism." It later ran advertisements reading "In any war between the civilized man and the savage, support the civilized man. Support Israel. Defeat Jihad." Several groups condemned the advertisements as "hate speech" about all Muslims. In early January 2013 the Freedom Defense Initiative put up advertisements next to 228 clocks in 39 New York subway stations showing the 2001 attacks on the World Trade Center with a quote attributed to the 151st verse of chapter 3 of the Quran: "Soon shall we cast terror into the hearts of the unbelievers." The New York City Transit Authority, which said it would have to carry the advertisements on First Amendment grounds, insisted that 25% of the ad contain a Transit Authority disclaimer. These advertisements also were criticized.

The English Defence League (EDL), an organization in the United Kingdom, has been described as anti-Muslim. It was formed in 2009 to oppose what it considers to be a spread of Islamism, Sharia law and Islamic extremism in the UK. The EDL's former leader, Tommy Robinson, left the group in 2013 saying it had become too extreme and that street protests were ineffective.

Furthermore, the 7 July 2005 London bombings and the resulting efforts of the British civil and law enforcement authorities to help seek British Muslims' help in identifying potential threats to create prevention is observed by Michael Lavalette as institutionalized Islamophobia. Lavalette alleges that there is a continuity between the former two British governments over prevention that aims to stop young Muslim people from being misled, misdirected and recruited by extremists who exploit grievances for their own "jihadist" endeavors. Asking and concentrating on Muslim communities and young Muslims to prevent future instances, by the authorities, is in itself Islamophobia as such since involvement of Muslim communities will highlight and endorse their compassion for Britain and negate the perceived threats from within their communities.

Public opinion

The extent of negative attitudes towards Muslims varies across different parts of Europe. Polls in Germany and the Czech Republic (as well as South Korea) have suggested that most respondents do not welcome Muslim refugees in those countries.

A 2017 Chatham House poll of more than 10,000 people in 10 European countries had on average 55% agreeing that all further migration from Muslim-majority countries should be stopped, with 20% disagreeing and 25% offered no opinion. By country, majority opposition was found in Poland (71%), Austria (65%), Belgium (64%), Hungary (64%), France (61%), Greece (58%), Germany (53%), and Italy (51%).

In Canada, surveys have suggested that 55% of respondents think the problem of Islamophobia is "overblown" by politicians and media, 42% think discrimination against Muslims is 'mainly their fault', and 47% support banning headscarves in public.

In the United States, a 2011 YouGov poll found that 50% of respondents expressed an unfavorable view of Islam, compared to 23% expressing a favorable view. Another YouGov poll done in 2015 had 55% of respondents expressing an unfavorable view. However, according to a 2018 Institute for Social Policy and Understanding, 86% of American respondents said they wanted to "live in a country where no one is targeted for their religious identity", 83% told ISPU they supported "protecting the civil rights of American Muslims", 66% believed negative political rhetoric toward Muslims was harmful to U.S., and 65% agreed that Islamophobia produced discriminatory consequences for Muslims in America.

The chart below displays collected data from the ISPU 2018 American Muslim Poll  which surveyed six different faith populations in the United States. The statements featured in this chart were asked to participants who then responded on a scale from strongly agree to strongly disagree. The total percentage of those who answered agree and strongly agree are depicted as follows:

Question 1: "I want to live in a country where no one is targeted for their religious identity."

Question 2: "The negative things politicians say regarding Muslims is harmful to our country."

Question 3: "Most Muslims living in the United States are no more responsible for violence carried out by a Muslim than anyone else."

Question 4: "Most Muslims living in the United States are victims of discrimination because of their faith."

The table below represents the Islamophobia Index, also from the 2018 ISPU poll. This data displays an index of Islamophobia among faith populations in the United States.

Internalized Islamophobia 
ISPU also highlighted a particular trend in relation to anti-Muslim sentiment in the U.S. – internalized Islamophobia among Muslim populations themselves. When asked if they felt most people want them to be ashamed of their faith identity, 30% of Muslims agreed (a higher percentage than any other faith group). When asked if they believed that their faith community was more prone to negative behavior than other faith communities, 30% of Muslims agreed, again, a higher percentage than other faith groups.

Trends

Islamophobia has become a topic of increasing sociological and political importance. According to Benn and Jawad, Islamophobia has increased since Ayatollah Khomeini's 1989 fatwa inciting Muslims to attempt to murder Salman Rushdie, the author of The Satanic Verses, and since the 11 September attacks (in 2001). Anthropologist Steven Vertovec writes that the purported growth in Islamophobia may be associated with increased Muslim presence in society and successes. He suggests a circular model, where increased hostility towards Islam and Muslims results in governmental countermeasures such as institutional guidelines and changes to legislation, which itself may fuel further Islamophobia due to increased accommodation for Muslims in public life. Vertovec concludes: "As the public sphere shifts to provide a more prominent place for Muslims, Islamophobic tendencies may amplify."

Patel, Humphries, and Naik (1998) claim that "Islamophobia has always been present in Western countries and cultures. In the last two decades, it has become accentuated, explicit and extreme." However, Vertovec states that some have observed that Islamophobia has not necessarily escalated in the past decades, but that there has been increased public scrutiny of it. According to Abduljalil Sajid, one of the members of the Runnymede Trust's Commission on British Muslims and Islamophobia, "Islamophobias" have existed in varying strains throughout history, with each version possessing its own distinct features as well as similarities or adaptations from others.

In 2005 Ziauddin Sardar, an Islamic scholar, wrote in the New Statesman that Islamophobia is a widespread European phenomenon. He noted that each country has anti-Muslim political figures, citing Jean-Marie Le Pen in France; Pim Fortuyn in the Netherlands; and Philippe van der Sande of Vlaams Blok, a Flemish nationalist party in Belgium. Sardar argued that Europe is "post-colonial, but ambivalent". Minorities are regarded as acceptable as an underclass of menial workers, but if they want to be upwardly mobile anti-Muslim prejudice rises to the surface. Wolfram Richter, professor of economics at Dortmund University of Technology, told Sardar: "I am afraid we have not learned from our history. My main fear is that what we did to Jews we may now do to Muslims. The next holocaust would be against Muslims." Similar fears, as noted by Kenan Malik in his book From Fatwa to Jihad, had been previously expressed in the UK by Muslim philosopher Shabbir Akhtar in 1989, and Massoud Shadjareh, chair of the Islamic Human Rights Commission in 2000. In 2006 Salma Yaqoob, a Respect Party Councillor, claimed that Muslims in Britain were "subject to attacks reminiscent of the gathering storm of anti-Semitism in the first decades of the last century." Malik, a senior visiting fellow in the Department of Political, International and Policy Studies at the University of Surrey, has described these claims of a brewing holocaust as "hysterical to the point of delusion"; whereas Jews in Hitler's Germany were given the official designation of Untermenschen, and were subject to escalating legislation which diminished and ultimately removed their rights as citizens, Malik noted that in cases where "Muslims are singled out in Britain, it is often for privileged treatment" such as the 2005 legislation banning "incitement to religious hatred", the special funding Muslim organizations and bodies receive from local and national government, the special provisions made by workplaces, school and leisure centres for Muslims, and even suggestions by the Archbishop of Canterbury Rowan Williams and the former Lord Chief Justice, Lord Phillips, that sharia law should be introduced into Britain. The fact is, wrote Malik, that such well-respected public figures as Akhtar, Shadjareh and Yaqoob need "a history lesson about the real Holocaust reveals how warped the Muslim grievance culture has become."

In 2006 ABC News reported that "public views of Islam are one casualty of the post-September 11, 2001 conflict: Nearly six in 10 Americans think the religion is prone to violent extremism, nearly half regard it unfavorably, and a remarkable one in four admits to prejudicial feelings against Muslims and Arabs alike." They also report that 27 percent of Americans admit feelings of prejudice against Muslims. Gallup polls in 2006 found that 40 percent of Americans admit to prejudice against Muslims, and 39 percent believe Muslims should carry special identification. These trends have only worsened with the use of Islamophobia as a campaign tactic during the 2008 American presidential election (with several Republican politicians and pundits, including Donald Trump, asserting that Democratic candidate Barack Obama is secretly a Muslim), during the 2010 mid-term elections (during which a proposed Islamic community center was dubbed the "Ground Zero Mosque"), and the 2016 presidential election, during which Republican nominee Donald Trump proposed banning the entrance into the country of all Muslims. Associate Professor Deepa Kumar writes that "Islamophobia is about politics rather than religion per se"  and that modern-day demonization of Arabs and Muslims by US politicians and others is racist and Islamophobic, and employed in support of what she describes as an unjust war. About the public impact of this rhetoric, she says that "One of the consequences of the relentless attacks on Islam and Muslims by politicians and the media is that Islamophobic sentiment is on the rise." She also chides some "people on the left" for using the same "Islamophobic logic as the Bush regime". In this regards, Kumar confirms the assertions of Stephen Sheehi, who "conceptualises Islamophobia as an ideological formation within the context of the American empire. Doing so "allows us to remove it from the hands of 'culture' or from the myth of a single creator or progenitor, whether it be a person, organisation or community." An ideological formation, in this telling, is a constellation of networks that produce, proliferate, benefit from, and traffic in Islamophobic discourses."

The writer and scholar on religion Reza Aslan has said that "Islamophobia has become so mainstream in this country that Americans have been trained to expect violence against Muslims – not excuse it, but expect it".

A January 2010 British Social Attitudes Survey found that the British public "is far more likely to hold negative views of Muslims than of any other religious group," with "just one in four" feeling "positively about Islam", and a "majority of the country would be concerned if a mosque was built in their area, while only 15 per cent expressed similar qualms about the opening of a church."

A 2016 report by CAIR and University of California, Berkeley's Center for Race and Gender said that groups promoting islamophobia in the US had access to US$206 million between 2008 and 2013. The author of the report said that "The hate that these groups are funding and inciting is having real consequences like attacks on mosques all over the country and new laws discriminating against Muslims in America."

In the United States, religious discrimination against Muslims has become a significant issue of concern. In 2018, The Institute for Social Policy and Understanding found that out of the groups studied, Muslims are the most likely faith community to experience religious discrimination, the data having been that way since 2015. Despite 61% of Muslims reporting experiencing religious discrimination at some level and 62% reporting that most Americans held negative stereotypes about their community,  23% reported that their faith made them feel "out of place in the world". There are intersections with racial identity and gender identity, with 73% of Arabs surveyed being more likely to experience religious discrimination, and Muslim women (75%) and youth (75%) being the most likely to report experiencing racial discrimination. The study also found that, although, "most Muslims (86%) express pride in their faith identity, they are the most likely group studied to agree that others want them to feel shame for that identity (30% of Muslims vs. 12% of Jews, 16% of non-affiliated, and 4–6% of Christian groups)."

A 2021 survey affiliated with Newcastle University found that 83% of Muslims in Scotland said they experienced Islamophobia such as verbal or physical attacks. 75% of them said Islamophobia is a regular or everyday issue in Scottish society and 78% believed it was getting worse.

Anti-Islamic hate crimes data in the United States

Data on types of hate crimes have been collected by the U.S. FBI since 1992, to carry out the dictates of the 1990 Hate Crime Statistics Act.  Hate crime offenses include crimes against persons (such as assaults) and against property (such as arson), and are classified by various race-based, religion-based, and other motivations.

The data show that recorded anti-Islamic hate crimes in the United States jumped dramatically in 2001.  Anti-Islamic hate crimes then subsided, but continued at a significantly higher pace than in pre-2001 years.  The step up is in contrast to decreases in total hate crimes and to the decline in overall crime in the U.S. since the 1990s.

Specifically, the FBI's annual hate crimes statistics reports from 1996 to 2013 document average numbers of anti-Islamic offenses at 31 per year before 2001, then a leap to 546 in 2001 (the year of 9-11 attacks), and averaging 159 per since.  Among those offenses are anti-Islamic arson incidents which have a similar pattern:  arson incidents averaged 0.4 per year pre-2001, jumped to 18 in 2001, and averaged 1.5 annually since.

2021, One of the members of Congress shared an anti-Muslim story about Muslim member of Congress during Thanksgiving break. This has happened many times.

Year-by-year anti-Islamic hate crimes, all hate crimes, and arson subtotals are as follows:

In contrast, the overall numbers of arson and total offenses declined from pre-2001 to post-2001.

Anti-Islamic hate crimes in the European countries

There have also been reports of hate crimes targeting Muslims across Europe. These incidents have increased after terrorist attacks by extremist groups such as ISIL.  Far-right and right-wing populist political parties and organizations have also been accused of fueling fear and hatred towards Muslims. Hate crimes such as arson and physical violence have been attempted or have occurred in Norway, Poland, Sweden, France, Spain, Denmark, Germany and Great Britain. Politicians have also made anti-Muslim comments when discussing the European migrant crisis.

According to MDPI: The Islamophobia Industry in America is another related-issue; it mentions: "The industry is driven by neocon stars: Daniel Pipes, Robert Spencer, David Yerushalmi, Glenn Beck, Pamela Gellner, Paul Wolfowitz, David Horowitz, and Frank Gaffney as well as native informers Walid Shoebat, Walid Phares, Wafa Sultan, Ayaan Hirsi Ali, Ibn Warraq, Brigitte Gabriel, Tawfik Hamid, and Zuhdi Jasser. They have been prolific, producing and re-circulating false or exaggerated information about Islam and Muslims in order to gain lucrative speaking engagements and increase their influence among neocons in government."

Reports by governmental organizations

The largest project monitoring Islamophobia was undertaken following 9/11 by the EU watchdog, European Monitoring Centre on Racism and Xenophobia (EUMC). Their May 2002 report "Summary report on Islamophobia in the EU after 11 September 2001", written by Chris Allen and Jorgen S. Nielsen of the University of Birmingham, was based on 75 reports  – 15 from each EU member nation. The report highlighted the regularity with which ordinary Muslims became targets for abusive and sometimes violent retaliatory attacks after 9/11. Despite localized differences within each member nation, the recurrence of attacks on recognizable and visible traits of Islam and Muslims was the report's most significant finding. Incidents consisted of verbal abuse, blaming all Muslims for terrorism, forcibly removing women's hijabs, spitting on Muslims, calling children "Osama", and random assaults. A number of Muslims were hospitalized and in one instance paralyzed. The report also discussed the portrayal of Muslims in the media. Inherent negativity, stereotypical images, fantastical representations, and exaggerated caricatures were all identified. The report concluded that "a greater receptivity towards anti-Muslim and other xenophobic ideas and sentiments has, and may well continue, to become more tolerated."

The EUMC has since released a number of publications related to Islamophobia, including The Fight against Antisemitism and Islamophobia: Bringing Communities together (European Round Tables Meetings) (2003) and Muslims in the European Union: Discrimination and Islamophobia (2006).

Professor in History of Religion, Anne Sophie Roald, states that Islamophobia was recognized as a form of intolerance alongside xenophobia and antisemitism at the "Stockholm International Forum on Combating Intolerance", held in January 2001. The conference, attended by UN Secretary General Kofi Annan, High Commissioner for Human Rights Mary Robinson, the Organization for Security and Co-operation in Europe Secretary General Ján Kubis and representatives of the European Union and Council of Europe, adopted a declaration to combat "genocide, ethnic cleansing, racism, antisemitism, Islamophobia and xenophobia, and to combat all forms of racial discrimination and intolerance related to it."

The Organisation of Islamic Cooperation, in its 5th report to Islamophobia Observatory of 2012, found an "institutionalization and legitimization of the phenomenon of Islamophobia" in the West over the previous five years.

In 2014 Integrationsverket (the Swedish National Integration Board) defined Islamophobia as "racism and discrimination expressed towards Muslims."

In 2016, the European Islamophobia Report (EIR) presented the "European Islamophobia Report 2015" at European Parliament which analyzes the "trends in the spread of Islamophobia" in 25 European states in 2015. The EIR defines Islamophobia as anti-Muslim racism. While not every criticism of Muslims or Islam is necessarily Islamophobic, anti-Muslim sentiments expressed through the dominant group scapegoating and excluding Muslims for the sake of power is.

Research on Islamophobia and its correlates

Various studies have been conducted to investigate Islamophobia and its correlates among majority populations and among Muslim minorities themselves. To start with, an experimental study showed that anti-Muslim attitudes may be stronger than more general xenophobic attitudes. Moreover, studies indicate that anti-Muslim prejudice among majority populations is primarily explained by the perception of Muslims as a cultural threat, rather than as a threat towards the respective nation's economy.

Studies focusing on the experience of Islamophobia among Muslims have shown that the experience of religious discrimination is associated with lower national identification and higher religious identification. In other words, religious discrimination seems to lead Muslims to increase their identification with their religion and to decrease their identification with their nation of residence. Some studies further indicate that societal Islamophobia negatively influences Muslim minorities' health. One of the studies showed that the perception of an Islamophobic society is associated with more psychological problems, such as depression and nervousness, regardless whether the respective individual had personally experienced religious discrimination. As the authors of the study suggest, anti-discrimination laws may therefore be insufficient to fully protect Muslim minorities from an environment which is hostile towards their religious group.

Farid Hafez and Enes Bayrakli publish an annual European Islamophobia Report since 2015. The European Islamophobie Report aims to enable policymakers as well as the public to discuss the issue of Islamophobia with the help of qualitative data. It is the first report to cover a wide range of Eastern European countries like Serbia, Croatia, Hungary, Lithuania, and Latvia. Farid Hafez is also editor of the German-English Islamophobia Studies Yearbook.

Geographic trends
An increase of Islamophobia in Russia follows the growing influence of the strongly conservative sect of Wahhabism, according to Nikolai Sintsov of the National Anti-Terrorist Committee.

Various translations of the Qur'an have been banned by the Russian government for promoting extremism and Muslim supremacy. Anti-Muslim rhetoric is on the rise in Georgia. In Greece, Islamophobia accompanies anti-immigrant sentiment, as immigrants are now 15% of the country's population and 90% of the EU's illegal entries are through Greece. In France Islamophobia is tied, in part, to the nation's long-standing tradition of secularism. In Myanmar (Burma) the 969 Movement has been accused of events such as the 2012 Rakhine State riots.

Jocelyne Cesari, in her study of discrimination against Muslims in Europe, finds that anti-Islamic sentiment may be difficult to separate from other drivers of discrimination. Because Muslims are mainly from immigrant backgrounds and the largest group of immigrants in many Western European countries, xenophobia overlaps with Islamophobia, and a person may have one, the other, or both. So, for example, some people who have a negative perception of and attitude toward Muslims may also show this toward non-Muslim immigrants, either as a whole or certain group (such as, for example, Eastern Europeans, sub-Saharan Africans, or Roma), whereas others would not. Nigel Farage, for example, is anti-EU and in favor of crackdowns on immigration from Eastern Europe, but is favourable to immigration from Islamic Commonwealth countries such as Nigeria and Pakistan. In the United States, where immigrants from Latin America and Asia dominate and Muslims are a comparatively small fraction, xenophobia and Islamophobia may be more easily separable. Classism is another overlapping factor in some nations. Muslims have lower income and poorer education in France, Spain, Germany, and the Netherlands while Muslims in the US have higher income and education than the general population. In the UK, Islam is seen as a threat to secularism in response to the calls by some Muslims for blasphemy laws. In the Netherlands, Islam is seen as a socially conservative force that threatens gender equality and the acceptance of homosexuality.

The European Network Against Racism (ENAR) reports that Islamophobic crimes are on the increase in France, England and Wales. In Sweden crimes with an Islamophobic motive increased by 69% from 2009 to 2013.

A report from Australia has found that "except for Anglicans, all Christian groups have Islamophobia scores higher than the national average" and that "among the followers of non-Christian religious affiliations, Buddhists and Hindus [also] have significantly higher Islamophobia scores."

In 2016, the South Thailand Insurgency, having caused more than 6,500 deaths and purportedly fuelled in part by the Thai military's harsh tactics, was reported to be increasing Islamophobia in the country. The Mindanao conflict in the Philippines has also fuelled discrimination against Muslims by some Christian Filipinos.

The 2018 anti-Muslim riots in Sri Lanka was suggested to have been a possible trigger for the 2019 Easter bombings. Muslims in the country have reportedly faced increased harassment after the bombings, with some Sinhala Buddhist groups calling for boycotts of Muslim businesses and trade.

In July 2019, the UN ambassadors from 22 nations, including Canada, Germany and France, signed a joint letter to the UNHRC condemning China's mistreatment of the Uyghurs as well as its mistreatment of other Muslim minority groups, urging the Chinese government to close the Xinjiang re-education camps, though ambassadors from 53 others, not including China, rejected said allegations. According to a 2020 report by the Australian Strategic Policy Institute, since 2017, Chinese authorities have destroyed or damaged 16,000 mosques in Xinjiang – 65% of the region's total.

The 2020 Delhi riots, which left more than 50 dead and hundreds injured, were triggered by protests against a citizenship law seen by many critics as anti-Muslim and part of Prime Minister Narendra Modi's Hindu nationalist agenda.

Criticism of term and use
Although by the first decade of the 21st century the term "Islamophobia" had become widely recognized and used, its use, its construction and the concept itself have been criticized. Roland Imhoff and Julia Recker, in an article that puts forward the term "Islamoprejudice" as a better alternative, write that "... few concepts have been debated as heatedly over the last ten years as the term Islamophobia."

Academic debate

Jocelyne Cesari reported widespread challenges in the use and meaning of the term in 2006. According to The Oxford Encyclopedia of Islam and Politics, "Much debate has surrounded the use of the term, questioning its adequacy as an appropriate and meaningful descriptor. However, since Islamophobia has broadly entered the social and political lexicon, arguments about the appropriateness of the term now seem outdated". At the same time, according to a 2014 edition of A Dictionary of Sociology by Oxford University Press, "the exact meaning of Islamophobia continues to be debated amongst academics and policymakers alike." The term has proven problematic and is viewed by some as an obstacle to constructive criticism of Islam. Its detractors fear that it can be applied to any critique of Islamic practices and beliefs, suggesting terms such as "anti-Muslim" instead.

The classification of "closed" and "open" views set out in the Runnymede report has been criticized as an oversimplification of a complex issue by scholars like Chris Allen, Fred Halliday, and Kenan Malik. Paul Jackson, in a critical study of the anti-Islamic English Defence League, argues that the criteria put forward by the Runnymede report for Islamophobia "can allow for any criticism of Muslim societies to be dismissed...". He argues that both jihadi Islamists and far-right activists use the term "to deflect attention away from more nuanced discussions on the make-up of Muslim communities", feeding "a language of polarised polemics". On one hand, it can be used "to close down discussion on genuine areas of criticism" regarding jihadi ideologies, which in turn has resulted in all accusations of Islamophobia to be dismissed as "spurious" by far-right activists. Consequently, the term is "losing much [of its] analytical value".

Professor Eli Göndör wrote that the term Islamophobia should be replaced with "Muslimophobia". As Islamophobia is "a rejection of a population on the grounds of Muslimness", other researches suggest "Muslimism".

Professor Mohammad H. Tamdgidi of the University of Massachusetts, Boston, has generally endorsed the definition of Islamophobia as defined by the Runnymede Trust's Islamophobia: A Challenge for Us All. However, he notes that the report's list of "open" views of Islam itself presents "an inadvertent definitional framework for Islamophilia": that is, it "falls in the trap of regarding Islam monolithically, in turn as being characterized by one or another trait, and does not adequately express the complex heterogeneity of a historical phenomenon whose contradictory interpretations, traditions, and sociopolitical trends have been shaped and has in turn been shaped, as in the case of any world tradition, by other world-historical forces."

Atheist author and professor Richard Dawkins has criticised the term Islamophobia. He has argued that while hatred of Muslims is "unequivocally reprehensible" the term Islamophobia itself is an "otiose word which doesn't deserve definition." In 2015, along with the National Secular Society, he expressed opposition to a proposal by then Labour Party leader Ed Miliband to make Islamophobia an "aggravated crime". Dawkins stated that the proposed law was based on a term that is too vague, puts religion above scrutiny and questioned if such a law under the term Islamophobia hypothetically could be used to prosecute Charlie Hebdo or if he could be jailed for quoting violent passages from Islamic scripture on Twitter.

Philosopher Michael Walzer says that fear of religious militancy, such as "of Hindutva zealots in India, of messianic Zionists in Israel, and of rampaging Buddhist monks in Myanmar", is not necessarily an irrational phobia, and compares fear of Islamic extremism with the fear Muslims and Jews could feel towards Christians during the crusades. However, he also writes that:

Islamophobia is a form of religious intolerance, even religious hatred, and it would be wrong for any leftists to support bigots in Europe and the United States who deliberately misunderstand and misrepresent contemporary Muslims. They make no distinction between the historic religion and the zealots of this moment; they regard every Muslim immigrant in a Western country as a potential terrorist; and they fail to acknowledge the towering achievements of Muslim philosophers, poets, and artists over many centuries.

Commentary
In the wake of the Jyllands-Posten Muhammad cartoons controversy, a group of 12 writers, including novelist Salman Rushdie and activist Ayaan Hirsi Ali, signed a manifesto entitled Together facing the new totalitarianism in the French weekly satirical newspaper Charlie Hebdo in March 2006, warning against the use of the term Islamophobia to prevent criticism of "Islamic totalitarianism". Rushdie added in 2012 that 'Islamophobia' "took the language of analysis, reason and dispute, and stood it on its head". Hirsi Ali added in 2017 that Islamophobia was a "manufactured" term whose usage emboldens radical Muslims to push for censorship and that "we can't stop the injustices if we say everything is 'Islamophobic' and hide behind a politically correct screen."

Left-wing journalist and 'New Atheist' writer Christopher Hitchens stated in February 2007 that "a stupid term – Islamophobia – has been put into circulation to try and suggest that a foul prejudice lurks behind any misgivings about Islam's infallible 'message. Writing in the New Humanist in May 2007, philosopher Piers Benn suggests that people who fear the rise of Islamophobia foster an environment "not intellectually or morally healthy", to the point that what he calls "Islamophobia-phobia" can undermine "critical scrutiny of Islam as somehow impolite, or ignorant of the religion's true nature."

Alan Posener and Alan Johnson have written that, while the idea of Islamophobia is sometimes misused, those who claim that hatred of Muslims is justified as opposition to Islamism actually undermine the struggle against Islamism.  The author Sam Harris, while denouncing bigotry, racism, and prejudice against Muslims or Arabs, rejects the term Islamophobia as an invented psychological disorder, and states criticizing those Islamic beliefs and practices he believes pose a threat to civil society is not a form of bigotry or racism. Similarly, Pascal Bruckner calls the term "a clever invention because it amounts to making Islam a subject that one cannot touch without being accused of racism."

Writing in 2008 Muslim reformist Ed Husain, a former member of Hizb ut-Tahrir and co-founder of Quilliam, said that under pressure from Islamist extremists, "'Islamophobia' has become accepted as a phenomenon on a par with racism", claiming that "Outside a few flashpoints where the BNP is at work, most Muslims would be hard-pressed to identify Islamophobia in their lives".

Conservative political commentator Douglas Murray has described Islamophobia in 2013 as a "nonsense term" and stated "a phobia is something of which one is irrationally afraid. Yet it is supremely rational to be scared of elements of Islam and of its fundamentalist strains in particular. Nevertheless, the term has been very successfully deployed, not least because it has the aura of a smear. Islamophobes are not only subject to an irrational and unnecessary fear; they are assumed to be motivated (because most Muslims in the West are from an ethnic minority) by "racism". Who would not recoil from such charges?"

In his paper "A Measure of Islamophobia", British academic Salman Sayyid (2014) argues that these criticisms are a form of etymological fundamentalism and echo earlier comments on racism and antisemitism. Racism and antisemitism were also accused of blocking free speech, of being conceptually weak and too nebulous for practical purposes.

French Prime Minister Manuel Valls said in January 2015 following the Charlie Hebdo shooting "It is very important to make clear to people that Islam has nothing to do with ISIS. There is a prejudice in society about this, but on the other hand, I refuse to use this term 'Islamophobia,' because those who use this word are trying to invalidate any criticism at all of the Islamist ideology. The charge of 'Islamophobia' is used to silence people".

Conservative journalist and commentator Brendan O'Neill stated in 2018 "Anti-Muslim prejudice is out there, yes. But 'Islamophobia' is an elite invention, a top-down conceit, designed to chill open discussion about religion and values and to protect one particular religion from blasphemy. The war on Islamophobia is in essence a demand for censorship."

Muslim reformist Maajid Nawaz, a former member of the Islamist Hizb ut-Tahrir group and founder of the counter-extremism Quilliam think-tank has criticized the term "Islamophobia" on several occasions, stating in 2020 it conflates racism with blasphemy and "there's a huge difference in being critical of an idea and critical of a person because of their political or religious identity." Nawaz argues that "anti-Muslim bigotry" is a more accurate phrase to use instead of Islamophobia when addressing prejudice faced by people of Muslim origin.

British-American physician, author and Muslim reformist writer Qanta A. Ahmed has argued against using the term Islamophobia and has cautioned against using it as part of anti-racism or hate speech legislation by claiming jihadis will exploit it. She has argued that "while we're getting better at thwarting terrorist attacks, we're still fighting their ideological underpinning. As a secular pluralistic democracy, we have weapons: intellectual scrutiny, critical thinking and above all the insight to command the language of this war of ideas. And to use the word Islamophobia when talking about anti-Muslim xenophobia is to use the vocabulary and adopt the rulebook of the Islamists who wish to obfuscate their intent."

The Associated Press Stylebook
In December 2012, media sources reported that the terms "homophobia" and "Islamophobia" would no longer be included in the AP Stylebook. Deputy Standards Editor Dave Minthorn said "a phobia is a psychiatric or medical term for a severe mental disorder," and thus not appropriate to use them in articles with political or social contexts because they imply an understanding of the mental state of another individual.

Countering Islamophobia

International
On 16 March 2022, UN designated March 15 as International Day To Combat Islamophobia.

Europe
On 26 September 2018, the European Parliament in Brussels launched the "Counter-Islamophobia Toolkit" (CIK), with the goal of combatting the growing Islamophobia across the EU and to be distributed to national governments and other policy makers, civil society and the media. Based on the most comprehensive research in Europe, it examines patterns of Islamophobia and effective strategies against it in eight member states. It lists ten dominant narratives and ten effective counter-narratives.

One of the authors of the CIK, Amina Easat-Daas, says that Muslim women are disproportionately affected by Islamophobia, based on both the "threat to the west" and "victims of...Islamic sexism" narratives. The approach taken in the CIK is a four-step one: defining the misinformed narratives based on flawed logic; documenting them; deconstructing these ideas to expose the flaws; and finally, reconstruction of mainstream ideas about Islam and Muslims, one closer to reality. The dominant ideas circulating in popular culture should reflect the diverse everyday experiences of Muslims and their faith.

See also

 Anti-Arabism
 Criticism of Islam
 Peace in Islam
 Persecution of Muslims
 International Day To Combat Islamophobia
 Islamophobia in the media
 Islamophobia Watch
 Islamophobic incidents
 Nativism (politics)
 Nativism (politics) in the United States
 Religious intolerance
 Religious persecution
 Religious violence
 Religious war
9/11
7/7 Attacks
 Minority stress
 World Hijab Day

References

Notes

Citations

Sources

Further reading

  Ali, Wajahat; Clifton, Eli; Duss, Matthew; Fang, Lee; Keyes, Scott; and Shakir, Faiz (August 26, 2011) "Fear, Inc.: The Roots of the Islamophobia Network in America". American Progress. Accessed 24 February 2015.
 Allen, Chris (2011). Islamophobia. Ashgate Publishing Company.
 
 Duss, Matthew; Taeb; Yasmine; Gude, Ken; and Sofer, Ken (February 11, 2015) "Fear, Inc. 2.0: The Islamophobia Network's Efforts to Manufacture Hate in America". American Progress.  Accessed 24 February 2015.
 
 
 Itaoui, Rhonda (2016). "The Geography of Islamophobia in Sydney: mapping the spatial imaginaries of young Muslims", in Australian Geographer. Vol 47:3, 261–79.
 Kaplan, Jeffrey (2006). "Islamophobia in America?: September 11 and Islamophobic Hate Crime ", Terrorism and Political Violence (Routledge), 18:1, 1–33.
 Kincheloe, Joe L. and Steinberg, Shirley R. (2004). The Miseducation of the West: How the Schools and Media Distort Our Understanding of Islam. Westport, Connecticut: Praeger Press. (Arabic Edition, 2005).
 Kincheloe, Joe L. and Steinberg, Shirley R. (2010). Teaching Against Islamophobia. New York: Peter Lang.
 Konrad, Felix (2011). From the "Turkish Menace" to Exoticism and Orientalism: Islam as Antithesis of Europe (1453–1914)?, European History Online, Mainz: Institute of European History. Retrieved: 22 June 2011.
 Kundnani, Arun. (2014) The Muslims Are Coming! Islamaphobia, Extremism, and the Domestic War on Terror (Verso; 2014) 327 pages
 Lajevardi, N. (2020). Outsiders at Home: The Politics of American Islamophobia. Cambridge: Cambridge University Press.
 
 
 
 
 
 Sheehi, Stephen (2011). Islamophobia: The Ideological Campaign Against Muslims. Clarity Press.
 Shryock, Andrew, ed. (2010). Islamophobia/Islamophilia: Beyond the Politics of Enemy and Friend. Indiana University Press. p. 250. Essays on Islamophobia past and present; topics include the "neo-Orientalism" of three Muslim commentators today: Ayaan Hirsi Ali, Reza Aslan, and Irshad Manji.
 Silva, Derek (2017). "The Othering of Muslims: Discourses of Radicalization in the New York Times, 1969–2014", Sociological Forum, 32:1, 138–161.
 Tausch, Arno with Bischof, Christian; Kastrun, Tomaz; and Mueller, Karl (2007). Against Islamophobia: Muslim Communities, Social-Exclusion and the Lisbon Process in Europe. Hauppauge, N.Y.: Nova Science Publishers. .
 Tausch, Arno with Bischof, Christian and Mueller, Karl (2008). Muslim Calvinism: Internal Security and the Lisbon Process in Europe. Purdue University Press. .
 Tausch, Arno (2007). Against Islamophobia: Quantitative Analyses of Global Terrorism, World Political Cycles and Center Periphery Structures. Hauppauge, N.Y.: Nova Science Publishers. .

External links

 Islamophobia Studies Journal – Islamophobia Research & Documentation Project, UC Berkeley
 Reports – European Islamophobia – European Islamophobia Reports EIR
 Islamophobia Today newspaper  – an Islamophobia news clearing house
 Sammy Aziz Rahmatti, Understanding and Countering Islamophobia

 
Political neologisms
Xenophobia
Racism